Kirk Richard Timmer (born December 18, 1963) is a former American football linebacker in the National Football League (NFL) for the Dallas Cowboys. He played college football at Montana State University.

Early years
Timmer attended Jefferson High School. He accepted a football scholarship from Montana State University, following the footsteps of his older brother Troy, who was a defensive tackle. As a redshirt freshman, he passed injured Jim Kalafat on the depth chart and was named the starter at middle linebacker.

As a sophomore, he led the team with 138 tackles, while contributing to the school winning the Division I-AA National Championship with a 12-2 record. He also set a single-game school record with 18 tackles against Arkansas State University.

As a senior, he posted 137 tackles and 3 forced fumbles. He left as the school's all-time leader in career tackles (519) and was inducted into the MSU Athletics Hall of Fame.

Professional career
Timmer was selected by the New York Jets in the 11th round (300th overall) of the 1987 NFL Draft. He was tried at left inside linebacker during training camp. He was waived before the start of the season on August 27.

After the NFLPA strike was declared on the third week of the season, those contests were canceled (reducing the 16 game season to 15) and the NFL decided that the games would be played with replacement players. In September, he was signed to be a part of the Dallas replacement team that was given the mock name "Rhinestone Cowboys" by the media. He appeared in 1 game as a backup at middle linebacker behind Russ Swan, before being released.

Personal life
Timmer married Kelly Angelos, a guard on the Montana State University women's basketball team.

References 

1963 births
Living people
People from Butte, Montana
Players of American football from Montana
American football linebackers
Montana State Bobcats football players
Dallas Cowboys players